The Great Hotel Murder is a 1935 American mystery film directed by Eugene Forde and starring Edmund Lowe, Victor McLaglen, Rosemary Ames and Mary Carlisle. It is based on Recipe for Murder a 1934 story by Vincent Starrett.

The film stars Lowe and McLaglen as rival sleuths, with supporting roles for Lynn Bari and Madge Bellamy. It was one of a series of films featuring Lowe and McLaglen as friendly rivals dating back to their first pairing in the hit 1926 silent film What Price Glory?.

It was produced by Fox Film, shortly before the merger with Twentieth Century Pictures. The film's sets were designed by the art director Duncan Cramer.

Cast

 Edmund Lowe as Roger Blackwood
 Victor McLaglen as Andrew W. 'Andy' McCabe
 Rosemary Ames as Eleanor Blake
 Mary Carlisle as Olive Temple
 Henry O'Neill as 	Mr. Harvey
 C. Henry Gordon as Dr. John M. Temple
 William Janney as Harry Prentice
 Charles C. Wilson as 	Anthony Wilson
 John Wray as 	Feets Moore
 John Qualen as Ole
 Herman Bing as 	Hans
 Madge Bellamy as 	Tessie
 Robert Gleckler as 	Police Captain
 Clarence Wilson as Girando
 Betty Bryson as 	Irene Harvey 
 Mary Alden as Mrs. Harvey
 Walter Walker as Dr. Chambers 
 Sumner Getchell as 	Bunny
 Astrid Allwyn as Nora, Bookstand Girl 
 Larry Steers as 	Henry, Hotel Clerk
 Gino Corrado as 	Head Waiter 
 Alphonse Martell as 	Head Waiter 
 Selmer Jackson as Railroad Ticket Agent
 Lynn Bari as Wilson's Receptionist
 Martin Faust as 	Waiter 
 Otto Hoffman as 	Station Agent 
 Landers Stevens as 	Hotel Doorman
 Ralph McCullough as Hotel Clerk

References

External links
 

1935 films
Fox Film films
Films directed by Eugene Forde
1935 mystery films
American mystery films
American black-and-white films
1930s American films
1930s English-language films